Morris Louis Bernstein (November 28, 1912 – September 7, 1962), known professionally as Morris Louis, was an American painter. During the 1950s he became one of the earliest exponents of Color Field painting. While living in Washington, D.C., Louis, along with Kenneth Noland and other Washington painters, formed an art movement that is known today as the Washington Color School.

Early life and education
From 1929 to 1933, he studied at the Maryland Institute of Fine and Applied Arts (now Maryland Institute College of Art) on a scholarship, but left shortly before completing the program. Louis worked at various odd jobs to support himself while painting, and in 1935 was president of the Baltimore Artists' Association. From 1936 to 1940, he lived in New York City and worked in the easel division of the Works Progress Administration Federal Art Project. During this period, he knew Arshile Gorky, David Alfaro Siqueiros, and Jack Tworkov. He also dropped his last name.

Work

Color field painting
He returned to his native Baltimore in 1940 and taught privately. In 1948, he pioneered the use of Magna paint - a newly developed oil-based acrylic paint made for him by his friends, New York paintmakers Leonard Bocour and Sam Golden. In 1952, Louis moved to Washington, D.C. Living in Washington, D.C., he was somewhat apart from the New York scene and he was working almost in isolation. During the 1950s he and a group of artists that included Kenneth Noland, Gene Davis, Thomas Downing, Howard Mehring, Anne Truitt and Hilda Thorpe among others were central to the development of Color Field painting. The basic point about Louis's work and that of other Color Field painters, sometimes known as the Washington Color School in contrast to most of the other new approaches of the late 1950s and early 1960s, is that they greatly simplified the idea of what constitutes the look of a finished painting. They continued in a tradition of painting exemplified by Jackson Pollock, Barnett Newman, Clyfford Still, Mark Rothko, Robert Motherwell, and Ad Reinhardt. Eliminating gestural, compositional drawing in favor of large areas of raw canvas, solid planes of thinned and fluid paint, utilizing an expressive and psychological use of flat, and intense color and allover, repetitive composition. One of Louis's most important series of Color Field paintings were his Unfurleds.

Stain painting
All of the Color Field artists were concerned with the classic problems of pictorial space and the flatness of the picture plane. In 1953, Louis and Noland visited Helen Frankenthaler's New York studio, where they saw and were greatly impressed by her stain paintings, especially Mountains and Sea (1952). Upon their return to Washington, Louis and Noland together experimented with various techniques of paint application. Louis characteristically applied extremely diluted, thinned paint to an unprimed, unstretched canvas, allowing it to flow over the inclined surface in effects sometimes suggestive of translucent color veils. The importance of Frankenthaler's example in Louis's development of this technique has been noted. Louis reported that he thought of Frankenthaler as the bridge between Jackson Pollock and the possible. However, even more so than Frankenthaler, Louis eliminated the brush gesture, although his flat, thin pigment is at times modulated in billowing and subtle tones.

In 1954, Louis produced his mature Veil Paintings, which were characterized by overlapping, superimposed layers of transparent color poured onto and stained into sized or unsized canvas. The Veil Paintings consist of waves of brilliant, curving color-shapes submerged in translucent washes through which separate colors emerge principally at the edges. Although subdued, the resulting color is immensely rich. In another series, the artist used long parallel bands and stripes of pure color arranged side by side in rainbow effects.  The painting Tet is a good example of his Veil Paintings.

The thinned acrylic paint was allowed to stain the canvas, making the pigment at one with the canvas as opposed to "on top".  This conformed to Greenberg's conception of "Modernism" as it made the entire picture plane flat.

Late paintings

Louis destroyed many of his paintings between 1955 and 1957. He resumed work on the Veils in 1958–59. These were followed by Florals and Columns (1960), Alephs (1960), Unfurleds (1960–61) — in which rivulets of more opaque, intense color flow from both sides of large white fields of raw canvas — and finally the Stripe paintings (1961–62). Between summer 1960 and January/February 1961, he created about 150 Unfurleds, generally on mural-size canvases.

Artworks (selection) 

 Untitled, 1959–60, the Doris and Donald Fisher Collection at the San Francisco Museum of Modern Art in the Approaching American Abstraction Exhibition

Exhibitions
A memorial exhibition of Louis' work was held at the Solomon R. Guggenheim Museum in 1963. Major Louis exhibitions were also organized by the Museum of Fine Arts, Boston, in 1967 and the National Gallery of Art, Washington, D.C., in 1976.  In 1986 there was an important retrospective exhibition of his works at the Museum of Modern Art (MoMA) in New York. During 2007-2008 an important retrospective was held by museums in San Diego, at the Museum of Contemporary Art, in Atlanta at the High Museum, and in Washington, DC. at the Hirshhorn Museum and Sculpture Garden.

Art market
In 2015, a striped canvas by Louis, Number 36 (1962), from the collection of Lord Anthony and Lady Evelyn Jacobs sold for £1.5 million at Christie's London.

Personal life
He married Marcella Siegel in 1947. She supported him throughout his career and in memory of him she supported one artist every year through the Morris Louis Fellowship at George Washington University.

Death
Morris Louis was diagnosed with lung cancer in 1962 and soon after died at his home in Washington, D.C. on September 7, 1962. The cause of his illness was attributed to prolonged exposure to paint vapours.  The Estate of Morris Louis is represented exclusively by Diane Upright, a former professor of fine art at Harvard University.

See also
 Color field painting
 Washington Color School
 Post-painterly abstraction
 Magna paint

References

Sources
 Greenberg, Clement. Late Writings, edited by Robert C. Morgan, St. Paul: University of Minnesota Press, 2003.
The Columbia Encyclopedia
Kleiner, Fred S.; and Mamiya, Christin J., Gardner's Art Through the Ages (2004). Volume II. Wadsworth Publishing. .
Schwabsky, Barry. "Irreplaceable Hue - Color Field Painting." Art Forum 1994. Look Smart 20 April 2007.
Color As Field:American Painting, 1950-1975., retrieved December 7, 2008
Wilkin, Karen and Belz, Carl. Color As Field:American Painting, 1950-1975. Published: Yale University Press; 1 edition (November 29, 2007). , 
De Antonio, Emile and Tuchman, Mitchell. Painters Painting A Candid History of The Modern Art Scene, 1940–1970, Abbeville Press 1984, 
Various authors: Barbara Rose, Gerald Nordland, Walter Hopps, Hardy S. George; Breaking the Mold, Selections from the Washington Gallery of Modern Art, 1961–1968, exhibition catalogue, Oklahoma City Museum of Art 2007, 
 Carmean, E.A. Toward Color and Field, Exhibition Catalogue, Houston Museum of Fine Arts, 1971.
 Carmean, E.A. Helen Frankenthaler A Paintings Retrospective, Exhibition Catalog, Harry N. Abrams in conjunction with The Museum of Modern Art, Fort Worth, 
 Henning, Edward B. Color & Field, Art International May 1971: 46–50.
 Tucker, Marcia. The Structure of Color, New York: Whitney Museum of American Art, NYC, 1971.
 Michael Fried. Morris Louis, Harry N. Abrams, Library of Congress Number: 79-82872

External links
 Morris Louis - Official website
 Morris Louis at the National Gallery of Art
 
 Tate Collection Page
 2007 Retrospective
 “Morris Louis Now: An American Master Revisited”, September 20, 2007 to January 6, 2008
 Morris Louis - Artist Overview on The Art Story Foundation

1912 births
1962 deaths
Abstract expressionist artists
Abstract painters
20th-century American painters
American male painters
Baltimore City College alumni
Deaths from lung cancer
Jewish American artists
Jewish painters
Maryland Institute College of Art alumni
Modern painters
Artists from Baltimore
Works Progress Administration workers
Painters from Maryland
Painters from Washington, D.C.
Artists from Washington, D.C.
Artists from Maryland
20th-century American Jews
20th-century American male artists